Clifford "Trey" Beamon (born February 11, 1974) is an American former professional baseball player. He spent three seasons in Major League Baseball (MLB) as a left fielder and right fielder.

Career summary
After a prep career at W. T. White High School in Dallas, the Pirates chose Beamon in the second round of the 1992 MLB draft, with the 61st overall selection. Beamon advanced quickly through the minors, and after he batted .334 in 1995 as a 21-year-old with the Calgary Cannons of the AAA Pacific Coast League, Baseball America honored him as the organization's top prospect.

Beamon struggled to establish himself on the MLB, however. He appeared in 24 games with the Pirates in 1996 before being traded, with Angelo Encarnación to the San Diego Padres, in exchange for Mark Smith and Hal Garrett. He appeared in 43 games with the Padres the next year before being traded again; the Padres sent Beamon and Tim Worrell to the Detroit Tigers, receiving Dan Miceli, Donne Wall, and Ryan Balfe in return. Beamon appeared in 28 games with the Tigers in 1998, his final season in the major leagues. For his career, he compiled a .253 batting average, a .306 on-base percentage, and a .310 slugging percentage in 158 at bats.

Beamon continued his professional career in the minor leagues and in independent leagues. He was a Northern League all-star with the Allentown Ambassadors in 2000, leading that league in batting average (.381) and total hits (115). He was also a United League Baseball All-Star in 2006, his final season, as a member of the Alexandria Aces.

In the off-season, Beamon resides in Mesquite, Texas.

References

External links

1974 births
Living people
Allentown Ambassadors players
Alexandria Aces players
American expatriate baseball players in Canada
Atlantic City Surf players
Augusta Pirates players
Baseball players from Dallas
Binghamton Mets players
Calgary Cannons players
Carolina Mudcats players
Charlotte Knights players
Detroit Tigers players
Elmira Pioneers players
Gary SouthShore RailCats players
Gulf Coast Pirates players
Joliet JackHammers players
Lakeland Tigers players
Las Vegas Stars (baseball) players
Major League Baseball left fielders
Major League Baseball right fielders
New Jersey Jackals players
Pittsburgh Pirates players
San Antonio Missions players
San Diego Padres players
Sioux City Explorers players
Sioux Falls Canaries players
Toledo Mud Hens players
Welland Pirates players
W. T. White High School alumni